State Route 95 or Bicentennial Highway is a state highway located in the southeast of the U.S. state of Utah. The highway is an access road for tourism in the Lake Powell and Cedar Mesa areas, notably bisecting Bears Ears National Monument and providing the only access to Natural Bridges National Monument. The highway does not serve any cities, but the small town of Hanksville is its western terminus. Although the highway has existed since the 1930s as a primitive dirt road, it received its name at its dedication as a paved state highway coincident with the U.S. Bicentennial in 1976. The highway forms part of the Trail of the Ancients National Scenic Byway.

Route description

It crosses Cottonwood Wash just west of the US-191 junction; follows and crosses White Canyon; and crosses the Colorado River and the northeast end of Lake Powell at Hite Crossing Bridge, near the confluence of the Dirty Devil River, which it crosses just two miles (3 km) later. 

It passes by the now closed Fry Canyon Lodge in Fry Canyon, which opened in 1955 and closed in 2007. Fry's Canyon (also referred to as Fry's Gulch) contained the only gas station between Hanksville and Blanding, but it has since closed and there are no services on the route itself. A seasonal gas station is in operation at the Hite Marina area during the summer months.

History
 
SR-95 was added to the state highway system in 1935 as a spur connecting SR-47 (now US-191) near Blanding with Natural Bridges National Monument. It was extended in 1949, crossing the Colorado River at Hite and continuing to SR-24 at Hanksville. Except for a short piece near Blanding, the road remained unpaved through the 1960s. The first major realignment was approved in 1962 and completed in 1966, bypassing the old crossing at Hite, which is now flooded by Lake Powell, in favor of the new Hite Crossing Bridge. The highway was improved and paved in time for the U.S. Bicentennial in 1976, and has since been known as the Bicentennial Highway.

Major intersections

References

External links

 Utah Highways by Dan Stober

095
095
 095
 095
 095